The 28th District of the Iowa House of Representatives in the state of Iowa.

Current elected officials
Jon Thorup is the representative currently representing the district.

Past representatives
The district has previously been represented by:
 Charles E. Knoblauch, 1971–1973
 Wally Horn, 1973–1983
 Donald Avenson, 1983–1991
 Charles D. Hurley, 1991–1997
 Steven L. Falck, 1997–2002
 Jackie Reeder, 2002–2003
 Pat Murphy, 2003–2013
 Greg Heartsill, 2013–2019
 Jon Thorup, 2019–present

References

028